Jaflong is a hill station and tourist destination in the Division of Sylhet, Bangladesh. It is located in Gowainghat Upazila of Sylhet District and situated at the border between Bangladesh and the Indian state of Meghalaya, overshadowed by subtropical mountains and rainforests. It is known for its stone collections and is home of the Khasi tribe.

Introduction 
Jaflong is a tourist spot in Sylhet division. It is about 60 km from Sylhet town and takes two hours drive to reach there. Jaflong located amidst tea gardens and hills. It is situated beside the river Sari in the lap of Hill Khashia.

Attractions 
 Collection of rolling stones
 Colorful tribal life 
 Dawki  and Piyain Rivers
 Tea Garden
 Orange and Jackfruit gardens
 Betel leaf and areca nut gardens
 Dawki Bazar

Stone crushing 

The land grabbers occupied government Khasiland and reserved forestland and extracted stone by cutting small hills polluting the environment of Jaflong. They also established crushing mills on the forestland without permission from government.

Forestation program

In early 2005, Laskar Muqsudur Rahman, Deputy Conservator of Forests, Sylhet Forest Division, observed that Jaflong that he heard in his boyhood as the 'lungs' of Greater Sylhet was at stake due to on going encroachments and establishment of unauthorized stone crushing mills. He took initiatives to recover the land and establish a recreation-cum-botanical park named as 'Jaflong Green Park'.   The first foundation stone for the thematic Green Park at Jaflong was laid by Laskar Muqsudur Rahman, Deputy Conservator of Forests in 2005 with the cooperation of local forest staffs led by Forest Ranger Mohammad Ali. Nonetheless, at the inception it was a challenging task due to local conflicts and procedural constraints. The forestation program in Jaflong Green Park has been started under supervision of the joint forces, Jaflong Foundation and Forest Department. They have jointly taken up the forestation program with about 100 hectares of grabbed land. Under the forestation program, various types of trees, including hybrid Akash-moni, are being planted in the park to maintain ecological balance.

Gallery

See also
Jaintia Rajbari

References

External links

 Biodiversity of Jaflong
 Jubilant at Jaflong. The Daily Star

Sylhet District
Tourist attractions in Bangladesh